June is a Basque female given name meaning “place of the reeds”. The first records of this name appear in the Middle Ages. For example, there was one woman named June Juneiz in Iruñea in the 12th century.

References

Basque feminine given names